Tracey Hiete Smith (born January 29, 1971) is an American former professional tennis player.

Hiete, who grew up in Pacific Palisades, played college tennis for Duke University.

Graduating from Duke in 1993, Hiete played on the professional tour until 1998 and reached a career high singles ranking of 334 in the world. As a doubles player she made a WTA Tour main draw appearance at the 1996 Acura Classic and won three titles on the ITF Circuit, reaching a career best ranking of 257.

Hiete married Australian rugby league personality Jimmy Smith in 2009 and now lives in Sydney.

ITF finals

Doubles: 5 (3–2)

References

External links
 
 

1971 births
Living people
American female tennis players
Duke Blue Devils women's tennis players
Tennis players from Los Angeles
People from Pacific Palisades, California